Rockie D'Mello (born 26 October 1961) is an Indian-born Kenyan cricket umpire. He stood in one ODI game in 2001 and three Twenty20 Internationals between 2007 and 2010.

See also
 List of One Day International cricket umpires
 List of Twenty20 International cricket umpires

References

1961 births
Living people
Kenyan One Day International cricket umpires
Kenyan Twenty20 International cricket umpires
Cricketers from Mumbai
Indian emigrants to Kenya
Kenyan people of Goan descent
Kenyan people of Indian descent